The Granite Reef Diversion Dam is a concrete diversion dam located  Northeast of Phoenix, Arizona. It impounds the Salt River for irrigation purposes.

The dam diverts nearly all water from the Salt River into the Arizona and South Canals, which serve metropolitan Phoenix with irrigation and drinking water. The Salt River below Granite Reef is usually dry except following consistent and heavy upstream precipitation. When upstream lakes are full, minor and moderate releases are accomplished via floodgates at either end of the dam. The dam is designed to be overtopped by major releases, which can occur every 10 to 40 years.

The United States Bureau of Reclamation built the dam between 1906 and 1908 to replace Arizona Dam washed out in 1905. It is operated by the Salt River Project, an electric cooperative.

References

External links

Dams completed in 1908
Dams in Arizona
Buildings and structures in Maricopa County, Arizona
Historic American Engineering Record in Arizona
United States Bureau of Reclamation dams
1908 establishments in Arizona Territory